The 2017 OFC U-16 Women's Championship was the 4th edition of the OFC U-16/U-17 Women's Championship, the biennial international youth football championship organised by the Oceania Football Confederation (OFC) for the women's under-16/under-17 national teams of Oceania. The tournament was held in Samoa between 4 and 18 August 2017.

For this tournament the age limit was lowered from under-17 to under-16. The winners of the tournament qualified for the 2018 FIFA U-17 Women's World Cup in Uruguay as the OFC representative.

Teams
All eleven OFC member national teams entered the tournament. It would be the first time in the history of the OFC U-17 Women's Championship that all eleven members of the OFC take part in the tournament. However, Papua New Guinea, Solomon Islands and Vanuatu later withdrew from the tournament, so only eight teams would take part.

Withdrew

Venue
The matches were played at the J.S. Blatter Football Complex in Apia.

Squads

Players born on or after 1 January 2001 were eligible to compete in the tournament. Each team could name a maximum of 20 players.

Group stage
The draw for the group stage was held on 29 June 2017 at the OFC Headquarters in Auckland, New Zealand. The eleven teams were drawn into one group of six teams (Group A) and one group of five teams (Group B). Based on results of the previous three editions, New Zealand and Papua New Guinea were seeded into one pot and drawn into either Group A or B, while the remaining nine teams were placed in another pot and drawn into any of the remaining five spots in Group A or the remaining four spots in Group B.

After the withdrawal of Vanuatu in Group A, and Solomon Islands and Papua New Guinea in Group B, Group A was left with five teams and Group B was left with three teams. A draw was held on 29 July 2017 at the OFC Headquarters in Auckland, New Zealand, which saw Tonga moved from Group A to Group B so that both teams would have four teams. The tournament schedule was also revised and would end one week earlier, with the semi-finals and final now played on 15 and 18 August instead of 22 and 25 August.

Each group was played in round-robin format. The top two teams of each group advanced to the semi-finals.

All times were local, WST (UTC+13).

Group A

Group B

Knockout stage

Bracket

Semi-finals

Final
Winner qualified for 2018 FIFA U-17 Women's World Cup.

Winners

The following team from OFC qualified for the 2018 FIFA U-17 Women's World Cup.

1 Bold indicates champions for that year. Italic indicates hosts for that year.

Awards
The following awards were given at the conclusion of the tournament.

Goalscorers
14 goals

 Kelli Brown

9 goals

 Maggie Jenkins

7 goals

 Arabella Maynard

6 goals

 Grace Wisnewski

4 goals

 Katinka Takamatsu

3 goals

 Eseta Sinukula
 Jackie Pahoa
 Jayda Stewart

2 goals

 Piri Murare
 Ngametua Taringa
 Nathalia Viking
 Edsy Matao
 Maya Hahn
 Aniela Jensen
 Heipua Kohueinui
 Seini Lutu
 Ana Polovili

1 goal

 Elcy Naolavoa
 Oloataua Tofaeono
 Tehinnah Tatuava
 Vani Bainivalu
 Viniana Buke
 Dilaisana Drodrolagi
 Lusiana Lagilevu
 Emily Rokociri
 Fiona Ihage
 Marie-Laure Palene
 Britney Cunningham-Lee
 Macey Fraser
 Margot Ramsay
 Madeleen Ah Ki
 Zoe Ruby
 Sina Sataraka
 Nagem Uiagalelei
 Lositika Feke
 Siunipa Talasinga
 Litea Taukapo

1 own goal

 Melissa Iekawe (against New Zealand)
 Tiare Tuimavave (against New Caledonia)

References

External links
2017 OFC U-16 Women's Championship, oceaniafootball.com
Results

2017
U-16 Women's Championship
2017 in women's association football
2017 in youth association football
2017 OFC U-16 Women's Championship
August 2017 sports events in Oceania